Third Thomas Shoal, known as Banko Thomas in the Philippines, Bãi Đồng Cam in Vietnam, and 和平暗沙 in China, is a shoal/atoll in the north-west of the Spratly Islands in the South China Sea.

The shoal is one of three named after Thomas Gilbert, the captain of the Charlotte:

References

Shoals of the Spratly Islands